Oostplein is an underground station in the city of Rotterdam, located on the Rotterdam Metro lines A, B, and C. The station opened on 10 May 1982, the same date that the East-West Line (also formerly called the Caland line), of which it is a part, was opened.

The station is located near the border between the city center and Kralingen-Crooswijk borough, and is below the former site of the De Noord mill. Overground people can get on at RET-Rotterdam tram lines 7 and 21.

References

!Previous!!!!Line!!!!Next

Rotterdam Metro stations
Railway stations opened in 1982
1982 establishments in the Netherlands
Railway stations in the Netherlands opened in the 20th century